The 1993 International cricket season was from May 1993 to September 1993.

Season overview

May

Australia in England

July

India in Sri Lanka

August

South Africa in Sri Lanka

References

1993 in cricket